Gaso may refer to:

Gåsö, an island in the Swedish province Bohuslän
GASO, an abbreviation for Georgia Southern University
Gasó, another name for Rosarigasino, a rhyming slang language game traditionally associated with the city of Rosario, Argentina
Gaso, another name for Kwosso, a ball game played by the Afar people

See also
Gašo Knežević (born 1953), a Serbian law scholar